English usually refers to:

 English language
 English people

English may also refer to:

Peoples, culture, and language
 English, an adjective for something of, from, or related to England
 English national identity, an identity and common culture
 English language in England, a variant of the English language spoken in England
 English languages (disambiguation)
 English studies, the study of English language and literature
 English, an Amish term for non-Amish, regardless of ethnicity

Individuals
 English (surname), a list of notable people with the surname English
 People with the given name
 English McConnell (1882–1928), Irish footballer
 English Fisher (1928–2011), American boxing coach
 English Gardner (b. 1992), American track and field sprinter

Places

United States
 English, Indiana, a town
 English, Kentucky, an unincorporated community
 English, Brazoria County, Texas, an unincorporated community 
 English, Red River County, Texas, an unincorporated community 
 English, West Virginia, an unincorporated community

Other uses
 English (cue sports term), side spin on the cue ball
 English (novel), a Chinese novel by Wang Gang
 English (2013 film), an Indian Malayalam film
 English (2018 film), a Chinese film based on Wang's novel
 The English (TV series), a 2022 miniseries

See also
 Terminology of the British Isles
 List of dialects of the English language
 Old English
 Englisch
 British (disambiguation)
 England (disambiguation)
 Justice English (disambiguation)
 
 

Language and nationality disambiguation pages